Charlotte Coombe is a British literary translator working from French and Spanish into English. She graduated with a degree in Modern Languages & European Studies from the University of Bath in 2007. She has translated over a dozen works of fiction and non-fiction.

In 2019, she was shortlisted for the Premio Valle-Inclán for her translation of Fish Soup by Margarita García Robayo. She has been awarded two PEN Translates Awards for her translations, as well as the Oran Robert Perry Burke Award for Literary Translation from The Southern Review, in 2023.

In 2020, along with Tina Kover, she co-founded the YouTube channel Translators Aloud, shining a spotlight on literary translators reading from their work.

List of translated works: 
Vincent Doumeizel – The Seaweed Revolution 
Marvel Moreno December Breeze (co-translated with Isabel Adey) 
Antonio Diaz Oliva – 'Mrs. Gonçalves and the Lives of Others' 
Aitor Romero Ortega – 'Bridges of Bosnia' 
Victor Vegas – 'She Dances Alone' 
Jimena González - 'City' in Modern Poetry in Translation, Issue no. 1 Spring, 2021
Juan Villoro – 'The Parable of the Bread' in the anthology: And We Came Outside and Saw the Stars Again 
Mario Vargas Llosa – Speech for the opening of the 20th international literature festival berlin
Eduardo Berti – 'Imagined Lands' 
Ricardo Romero – 'Pandemic Diary'''] 
Margarita García Robayo – [https://charcopress.com/bookstore/holiday-heart Holiday Heart  
Marvel Moreno – 'Tea in Augsburg' (Co-translated with Isabel Adey)
Marvel Moreno – 'Self-Criticism'  (Co-translated with Isabel Adey)
Margarita García Robayo – Fish Soup 
Eduardo Berti – The Imagined LandRicardo Romero – The President's Room 
Abnousse Shalmani – Khomeini, Sade and MeAsha Miró and Anna Soler-Pont – Traces of SandalwoodMarc De Gouvenain – The Solomon Islands Witness''
Rosamaría Roffiel – 'These Are Things I Only Tell Myself'
Edgardo Nuñez Caballero – 'Landscapes With Beasts' 
Santiago Roncagliolo – 'The Well'

References 

Living people
Year of birth missing (living people)
Alumni of the University of Bath
21st-century British translators
Spanish–English translators
French–English translators
Literary translators